The Man on the Comet is a 1925 German silent adventure film directed by Alfred Halm starring Luciano Albertini, Maly Delschaft, and Elena Lunda.

The film's art direction was led by Willi Herrmann.

Cast
 Luciano Albertini as Tom Winston - ein Matrose
 Maly Delschaft
 Erwied Astor as Teddy Ellis - ein Ingenieur
 Vita Gardy as Christa - Frau Ellis Schwester
 Anna Gorilowa as La Prima Ballerina
 Rudolf Klein-Rhoden as Kapitän Fergusson
 Friedrich Kühne as Navarro - ein Artist
 Rudolf Lettinger as Benjamin
 Elena Lunda as Evelyn
 Lidiya F. Ryndina as Frau Ellis - Teddys Frau
 Marinka Spadoni as Die Mondgöttin
 Georgette von Platty as Amor
 Aruth Wartan as Carlo - ein Artist

References

Bibliography
 Grange, William. Cultural Chronicle of the Weimar Republic. Scarecrow Press, 2008.

External links

1925 films
Films of the Weimar Republic
Films directed by Alfred Halm
German silent feature films
1920s action adventure films
German action adventure films
German black-and-white films
Phoebus Film films
Silent adventure films
1920s German films